"It's a Beautiful World" is a song by English rock band Noel Gallagher's High Flying Birds. Written by frontman Noel Gallagher, it was released on 23 February 2018 as the second single from the band's third studio album Who Built the Moon? (2017).

Music video
The official video for "It's a Beautiful World", directed by Julian House. The video features Gallagher and his band performing in the studio with grainy stock film as well as a montage of archival footage which give the video a sixties feel. "It's a Beautiful World" was released on the band's Vevo account on 26 January 2018.

Personnel
 Noel Gallagher – guitars and vocals
 Samuel Dixon – bass
 Keefus Ciancia – keyboards
 Emre Ramazanoglu – drums
 Pete Lockett – percussion
 Charlotte Courbe aka Le Volume Courbe – French spoken word
 David Holmes – programming

Track listing
12"

Digital

Charts

References

2017 songs
Noel Gallagher's High Flying Birds songs
Songs written by Noel Gallagher